The Lagos Open is a defunct WCT, Grand Prix and Challenger affiliated tennis tournament played from 1976 to 1991. It was held in Lagos in Nigeria and played on outdoor clay courts from 1976 to 1980, then on outdoor hard courts from 1981 to 1991.

Nduka Odizor and Paul Haarhuis were the most successful players at the event, each winning the singles competition twice.

Results

Singles

Doubles

References
ATP Results Archive

Clay court tennis tournaments
Hard court tennis tournaments
Tennis tournaments in Nigeria
World Championship Tennis
Grand Prix tennis circuit
ATP Challenger Tour
20th century in Lagos
Tennis in Nigeria
International sports competitions in Lagos
1976 establishments in Nigeria
1991 disestablishments in Africa
1990s disestablishments in Nigeria
Recurring sporting events established in 1976
Recurring sporting events disestablished in 1991